Verconia aureopunctata is a species of colourful sea slug, a dorid nudibranch, a shell-less marine gastropod mollusk in the family Chromodorididae.

Distribution
This marine species is endemic to Australia and occurs off Tasmania and Victoria.

References

Chromodorididae
Gastropods of Australia
Gastropods described in 1987